KSRP is a radio station licensed to Dodge City, Kansas, United States. It airs a Christian format. The station went silent for a year from October 2013 to October 2014.

References

External links
 

SRP (FM)
Radio stations established in 2012
2012 establishments in Kansas